Megachile euzona is a species of bee in the family Megachilidae. It was described by Pérez in 1899.

References

Euzona
Insects described in 1899